Gene H. Haertling is an American engineer currently the Bishop Distinguished Professor Emeritus of Ceramic Engineering at Clemson University and is an Elected Fellow of the Institute of Electrical and Electronics Engineers and National Academy of Engineering for the development of transparent ferroelectric ceramics and new generations of electronic ceramic devices.

References

Year of birth missing (living people)
Living people
Members of the United States National Academy of Engineering
Fellow Members of the IEEE
Clemson University faculty
Missouri University of Science and Technology alumni
University of Illinois alumni
American electrical engineers